The Washington Interscholastic Activities Association (WIAA) is the governing body of athletics and activities for secondary education schools in the state of Washington. As of February 2011, the private, 501(c)(3) nonprofit organization consists of nearly 800 member high schools and middle/junior high schools, both public and private.

Purpose

Founded in 1905 to "create equitable playing conditions" between member teams, the WIAA plans and supervises interscholastic sports and activities approved and delegated by the various school district boards of directors. The organization emphasizes the importance of interscholastic sports and activities in the "total educational process" while recognizing that education is the primary responsibility of its member schools.

The WIAA creates and governs rules to establish uniformity of standards in sports and activities; to protect the safety and health of students; to shield students from exploitation by special interest groups; to provide fair and equal opportunities to all students participating; and to encourage good sportsmanship. A stated goal of the organization is to promote diversity of its membership at all levels.

The organization also provides member schools an open channel of communication with other members to organize any events and activities, as well as to resolve any issues. In addition, the WIAA recognizes achievement and excellence of member teams and individuals participating in sports and activities.

Funding
Primary funding for the WIAA is through ticket sales for state championships and other events. Additional funds are secured through corporate sponsorships, memberships fees, and small percentages of the sales of merchandise related to the organization and its member schools. As a private organization, the WIAA does not receive funding via tax dollars and is not financially supported by the State of Washington.

WIAA-sanctioned sports & activities
The WIAA oversees athletics and fine arts in Washington state. As of February 2011, the organization hosts 83 state championships for the following sports and activities:

Athletics

Other activities
 Cheerleading
 Dance & Drill Team
 Drama
 Forensics 
 Debate & Student Congress
 Music
 4H

Classification
The organization places member schools into one of six classification tiers based on enrollment ranges: 1B, 2B, 1A, 2A, 3A, and 4A. Classification tiers are based on student body enrollment in grades 9–11 and used by the WIAA to maintain fair and equal competition between its member high schools. The enrollment ranges are evaluated by the WIAA Executive Board biennially and finalized for a two-year period. Enrollments of single-gender schools are doubled for classification purposes.

Opt-up

Member schools may choose to move up to a higher classification tier to compete against schools with larger enrollments. The WIAA gives members two opportunities to "opt-up" for higher classification: 1) prior to the enrollment count that will inform the enrollment ranges for classification when evaluated and finalized by the Executive Board; and 2) a two-week period after the classification enrollment ranges have been finalized.

Schools that opt-up during the first opportunity are divided into equal classifications after the classification enrollment ranges have been finalized. Schools that elect to opt-up during the second opportunity must be approved by the board of their governing District and the WIAA Executive Board.

For the years 2010 through 2012, 9 schools opted up to 2B classification; 5 to 1A, 1 to 2A, 24 to 3A, and 4 schools opted up to 4A classification. In the past schools have opted up in order to prevent leagues from dissolving, as the Eastside Prep Eagles did in the 2012-2013 season, opting up from 1B to the 1A Emerald City, now playing schools with over double their enrollment.

League alignments

The WIAA is divided into nine districts that represent approximate geographical areas. Each district is presided over by a District Director. Member schools are aligned into geographical conferences or leagues for competition. District membership is determined by these conferences and leagues with the exception of two. The Columbia Basin Big Nine Conference and Central Washington Athletic Conference have member schools in two districts.
Conference and League alignment is determined annually. The following are league alignments as of 2016-2017 school year and are subject to revision to adjust for the 2016-2020 reclassification.

Northwest District One
The Northwest Interscholastic Activities Association governs WIAA District 1, which encompasses the five counties in the northwest section of Washington State: Whatcom, Skagit, Snohomish, San Juan, and Island. As of February 2011, Northwest District 1 includes seven leagues with member schools from all classifications and a single independent member school. The Western High School Athletic Conference regulates two 4A classification leagues and one 3A classification league. Its membership consists of high schools in the public school districts of Arlington, Edmonds, Everett, Lake Stevens, Marysville, Monroe, Mukilteo, Oak Harbor, Shoreline, Snohomish, and Stanwood.
The North Sound Conference regulates member schools residing in the 1A classification. Its membership consists of high schools in Snohomish, Island and north King counties, in and near Everett. The Northwest Conference regulates member schools in 3A, 2A and 1A classifications.  Its membership consists of high schools in western Whatcom, Skagit and counties, in and near Bellingham and Mount Vernon.
The Northwest 2B/1B League regulates member schools in 2B and 1B classifications. Its membership consists of high schools in San Juan, Skagit, Island and Snohomish counties.
The Northwest B League regulates member schools in 1B classification. Its membership consists of small public and private high schools in San Juan, Snohomish, Skagit and Whatcom counties.

WesCo 4A
Glacier Peak Grizzlies
Jackson Timberwolves
Kamiak Knights
Lake Stevens Vikings
Mariner Marauders
WesCo 2A/3A
Archbishop Murphy Wildcats (2A)
Arlington Eagles
Cascade Bruins
Cedarcrest Redwolves (2A)
Edmonds-Woodway Warriors
Everett Seagulls
Lynnwood Royals
Marysville-Getchell Chargers
Marysville-Pilchuck Tomahawks
Meadowdale Mavericks 
Monroe Bearcats
Mountlake Terrace Hawks 
Shorecrest Scots
Shorewood Thunderbirds
Snohomish Panthers
Stanwood Spartans
Northwest Conference (1A/2A/3A)
Anacortes Seahawks (2A)
Bellingham Red Raiders(2A)
Blaine Borderites (1A)
Burlington-Edison Tigers (2A)
Ferndale Golden Eagles (3A)
Lakewood Cougars (2A)
Lynden Lions (2A)
Lynden Christian Lyncs (1A)
Meridian Trojans (1A)
Mount Baker Mountaineers (1A) 
Mount Vernon Bulldogs (3A)
Nooksack Valley Pioneers (1A) 
Oak Harbor Wildcats (3A)
Sedro-Woolley Cubs (2A)
Sehome Mariners (2A)
Squalicum Storm (2A)
Northwest 1B/2B League (1B/2B)
Concrete Lions(1B)
Darrington Loggers(1B)
Friday Harbor Wolverines (2B)
La Conner Braves(2B)
Mount Vernon Christian Hurricanes (1B)
Orcas Island Vikings (2B) 
Chimacum Cowboys (2B) 
Coupeville Wolves (2B)
Northwest 1B League
Arlington Christian Lions
 Cedar Park Christian - Lynnwood Lions
Grace Academy Eagles
Shoreline Christian Chargers
Lopez Island Lobos
Lummi Nation Blackhawks
Providence Classical Christian Highlanders
Skykomish Rockets
Fellowship Christian Eagles
Tulalip Heritage Hawks
Orcas Christian School Saints

SeaKing District Two
The SeaKing District encompasses mostly schools in King County. The schools are in all classification sizes and separated into five leagues by size and location. A majority of the state's 3A schools are located in this district and the West Central District 3. The Center School, International Community School, International School, and Secondary BOC are independents in this District.

KingCo 4A
 Bothell Cougars
 Eastlake Wolves
 Inglemoor Vikings
 Issaquah Eagles
 Mount Si Wildcats
 Newport (Bellevue) Knights
 North Creek Jaguars
 Skyline Spartans
 Woodinville Falcons 
Redmond Mustangs 
KingCo 3A
Bellevue Wolverines 
Interlake Saints 
Juanita Ravens 
Lake Washington Kangaroos 
Liberty Patriots 
Mercer Island Islanders 
Hazen Highlanders 
KingCo 2A  
Sammamish Totems 
Foster Bulldogs 
Renton Redhawks
Highline Pirates 
Lindbergh Eagles 
Tyee Totems 
Evergreen Wolverines 
Metro (3A)
 Bainbridge Spartans
 Ballard Beavers
 Blanchet Braves
 Chief Sealth Seahawks
 Cleveland Eagles
 Eastside Catholic Crusaders
 Franklin Quakers
 Garfield Bulldogs
 Holy Names Cougars  (girls)
 Ingraham Rams
 Lakeside Lions
 Nathan Hale Raiders
 O'Dea Irish  (boys)
 Rainier Beach Vikings
 Roosevelt Roughriders
 Seattle Prep Panthers
 West Seattle Wildcats 
 Lincoln Lynx
Emerald Sound League (1A)
Bear Creek Grizzlies
Eastside Prep Eagles
Forest Ridge School of the Sacred Heart
Overlake Owls
Seattle Academy Cardinals
Sierra Spartans
Bush Blazers
Northwest Haüs
University Prep Pumas 
Sultan Turks
King's Knights
Cedar Park Christian Eagles
Granite Falls Tigers
South Whidbey Falcons
SeaTac (1B/2B)
Auburn Adventist Falcons (2B)
Christian Faith Eagles (1B)
Crosspoint Academy Warriors (2B)
Evergreen Lutheran Eagles (1B)
Concordia Christian Hawks (1B)
Northwest Yeshiva High School (1B)
Pope John Paul II Eagles (1B)
Puget Sound Adventist Sharks (1B)
Quilcene Rangers (1B)
Rainier Christian Mustangs (1B)
Seattle Lutheran Saints (2B)
Tacoma Baptist Crusaders (1B)
Independent
Seattle Waldorf School

West Central District Three
The WCD encompasses schools in Clallam, Jefferson, Kitsap, Pierce, Mason, Thurston, and King counties of the northern Peninsula and southern Puget Sound areas of Washington. The district has the most 4A  and 3A schools combined in the state, with 26 and 16 respectively. It includes schools from all classification sizes, although most of the 2B schools in the region are members SeaTac league of SeaKing District two.

North Puget Sound 3A/4A
Olympic
Auburn Trojans (3A)
Auburn Mountainview Lions (3A)
Auburn-Riverside Ravens (3A)
Decatur Golden Gators (4A)
Federal Way Eagles (4A)
Thomas Jefferson Raiders (3A)
Todd Beamer Titans (3A)
Cascade
Kennedy Lancers (4A)
Kentlake Falcons (3A)
Kent-Meridian Royals (3A)
Kentridge Chargers (4A)
Kentwood Conquerors (4A)
Mt. Rainier Rams (4A)
Tahoma Bears (4A)
South Puget Sound 4A 
Bethel Braves
Bellarmine Prep Lions
Curtis Vikings^
Emerald Ridge Jaguars
Graham-Kapowsin Eagles
Olympia Bears
Puyallup Vikings
Rogers Rams
South Kitsap Wolves
Sumner Spartans
South Sound Conference 3A
Capital Cougars
Central Kitsap Cougars
Gig Harbor Tides
North Thurston Rams
Peninsula Seahawks
River Ridge Hawks
Timberline Blazers
Yelm Tornados
Pierce County 3A
Bonney Lake Panthers
Lakes Lancers
Lincoln Abes
Mt. Tahoma Thunderbirds
Spanaway Lake Sentinels
Wilson Rams
Stadium Tigers
South Puget Sound 2A 
Enumclaw Hornets
Fife Trojans
Foss Falcons
Franklin Pierce Cardinals
Washington Patriots
White River Hornets
Clover Park Warriors
Orting Cardinals
Steilacoom Sentinels
Olympic 1A/2A
Bremerton Knights (2A)
Kingston Buccaneers (2A)
North Kitsap Vikings (2A)
North Mason Bulldogs (2A)
Olympic Trojans (2A)
Port Angeles Roughriders (2A)
Sequim Wolves (2A)
Nisqually 1A
Bellevue Christian Vikings
Cascade Christian Cougars
Charles Wright Tarriers
Seattle Christian Warriors
Vashon Island Pirates 
Port Townsend Redhawks 
Klahowya Eagles 
Life Christian Eagles
North Olympic 1B
Chief Kitsap Academy Bears
Clallam Bay Bruins
Crescent Loggers
Neah Bay Red Devils

Southwest Washington District Four
The Southwest District, as its name suggests, includes schools south of the Olympic Mountains and west of the Cascade Range. The Washington School for the Blind (1B), Three Rivers Christian (1B), King's Way Christian (1B), Maple Lane High School (1A), and Vancouver School of Arts and Academics (1A) are independents.

Greater St. Helens 3A/4A
Battle Ground Tigers (4A)
Camas Papermakers (4A)
Heritage Timberwolves (3A)
Skyview Storm (4A)
Union Titans (4A)
Evergreen Plainsmen (3A)
Kelso Hilanders (3A)
Mountain View Thunder (3A)
Prairie Falcons (3A)
Greater St. Helens 2A 
Columbia River Chieftains
Hockinson Hawks
Mark Morris Monarchs
R. A. Long Lumberjacks
Ridgefield Spudders
Washougal Panthers
Woodland Beavers 
Fort Vancouver Trappers
Hudson's Bay Eagles
Evergreen 2A
Aberdeen Bobcats
Black Hills Wolves
Centralia Tigers
Rochester Warriors
Tumwater Thunderbirds
W.F. West Bearcats 
Shelton Highclimbers
Evergreen 1A
Elma Eagles
Eatonville Cruisers
Hoquiam Grizzlies
Montesano Bulldogs
Tenino Beavers
Trico 1A
Castle Rock Rockets
King's Way Knights
La Center Wildcats
Seton Catholic Cougars
Columbia Bruins
Pacific 2B
Chief Leschi Warriors
Ilwaco Fishermen
North Beach Hyaks
Northwest Christian Wolverines
Ocosta Wildcats
Raymond Seagulls
South Bend Indians 
Forks Spartans
Central 2B
Adna Pirates
Kalama Chinooks
Morton-White Pass Timberwolves
Napavine Tigers
Onalaska Loggers
Rainier Mountaineers
Toledo Indians
Toutle Lake Ducks
Wahkiakum Mules
Winlock Cardinals 
Stevenson Bulldogs
Columbia Valley 1B
Columbia Adventist Kodiaks
Firm Foundation Eagles
Naselle Comets
Three Rivers Christian Eagles
Washington School for the Deaf Terriers 
Pe Ell Trojans 
Willapa Valley Titans  
Mossyrock Vikings
Coastal 1B
Lake Quinault Elks
Mary M. Knight Owls
North River Mustangs
Oakville Acorns
Taholah Chitwin
Wishkah Valley Loggers

Yakima Valley District Five
The Yakima Valley District includes schools in south central Washington. The schools are divided into 
five leagues.

CWAC 2A
East Valley Red Devils
Ellensburg Bulldogs
Ephrata Tigers (District 6)
Grandview Greyhounds
Othello Huskies
Prosser Mustangs
Selah Vikings
SCAC 1A
LaSalle Lightning
Naches Valley Rangers
Zillah Leopards
College Place Hawks
Connell Eagles
Kiona-Benton Bears
Royal Knights
Wahluke Warriors 
Toppenish Wildcats
Wapato Wolves
EWAC 2B 2B
Columbia Coyotes
 Dayton/Waitsburg Bulldogs
Kittitas Coyotes
Mabton Vikings
 Tri-Cities Prep Jaguars
 Walla Walla Valley Academy Knights
White Swan Cougars 
Warden Cougars 
River View Panthers 
Cle Elum-Roslyn Warriors
Goldendale Timberwolves
Granger Spartans
Highland Scots
Greater Columbia Gorge 1B
Sunnyside Christian Knights (Southeast 1B for football only)
Trout Lake Mustangs
Yakima Tribal School Eagles

North Central District Six

Columbia Basin Big-9 4A
A.C. Davis Pirates
Eastmont Wildcats
Eisenhower Cadets
Moses Lake Chiefs
Sunnyside Grizzlies
Wenatchee Panthers
West Valley Rams
Caribou Trail 1A
Cascade (Leavenworth) Kodiaks
Cashmere Bulldogs
Chelan Goats
Quincy Jackrabbits
Omak Pioneers
Central Washington 2B
Brewster Bears
Bridgeport Mustangs
Lake Roosevelt Raiders
Liberty Bell Mountain Lions
Manson Trojans
Oroville Hornets
Soap Lake Eagles 
Okanogan Bulldogs
Tonasket Tigers
Central Washington 1B
Cascade Christian Academy Wolverines
Easton Jaguars
Entiat Tigers
Waterville-Mansfield Shockers
Moses Lake Christian Academy Lions
Pateros Billygoats and Nannies
Riverside Christian Crusaders (District 5)
Wilson Creek Devils

Northeast District Seven

Northeast 1A
Colville Indians
Deer Park Stags
Freeman Scotties
Lakeside (9 Mile Falls) Eagles
Medical Lake Cardinals
Newport (Newport) Grizzlies
Riverside Rams
Northeast 2B
Asotin Panthers
Colfax Bulldogs
Davenport Gorillas
Jenkins (Chewelah) Cougars
Kettle Falls Bulldogs
Liberty Lancers
Lind-Ritzville-Sprague-Washtucna-Kahlotus Broncos
Mary Walker Chargers
Northwest Christian Crusaders
Reardan Indians
St. George's Dragons
Wilbur-Creston Wildcats
Northeast 1B
Almira Coulee Hartline Warriors
Columbia Lions
Curlew Cougars
Cusick Panthers
Inchelium Hornets
Northport Mustangs
Odessa-Harrington Titans
Republic Tigers
Selkirk Rangers
Valley Christian Panthers
Wellpinit Redskins

Greater Spokane/Mid-Columbia District Eight
The Greater Spokane League was formed in 1925 as the Spokane City League and became the GSL in 1976. District 8 was created to separate the larger schools (then AAA) from the smaller schools in District 7. Schools that dropped to 2A therefore leave the GSL and District 8, to the Great Northern League (GNL, formerly Frontier League) in District 7. Consequently, schools have gone through great lengths to remain in the league and maintain historic rivalries. Gonzaga Prep opts-up to 4A, despite having 2A enrollment numbers. For the 2020–21 school year, Cheney moved up to 3A; with only four teams left in the GNL, that league was folded and absorbed into a new GSL 2A division.

Mid-Columbia 3A/4A
Chiawana Riverhawks (4A)
Hanford Falcons (4A)
Pasco Bulldogs (4A)
Richland Bombers (4A)
Walla Walla Blue Devils (3A)
Kamiakin Braves (4A)
Kennewick Lions (3A)
Southridge Suns (3A)
Hermiston Bulldogs (3A)
Greater Spokane 2A/3A/4A
Central Valley Bears (4A)
Cheney Blackhawks (3A)
Clarkston Bantams (2A) 
East Valley Knights (2A) 
Ferris Saxons (3A)
Gonzaga Prep Bullpups (4A)
Lewis & Clark Tigers (4A)
Mead Panthers (3A)
Mt. Spokane Wildcats (3A)
North Central Indians (3A)
Pullman Greyhounds (2A)
Ridgeline Falcons (3A)
Rogers Pirates (2A)
Shadle Park Highlanders (2A)
University Titans (3A) 
West Valley Eagles (2A)

Southeast District Nine

Southeast 1B/2B
 Colton Wildcats
 Garfield-Palouse Vikings
 Pomeroy Pirates
 Prescott Tigers
 St. John-Endicott/LaCrosse Eagles
 Touchet Indians

Neighboring states (and province)
Oregon School Activities Association
Idaho High School Activities Association
British Columbia School Sports (Canada)

References

External links

WIAA History

 
High school sports associations in the United States
Sports organizations established in 1920